Zouzou (born Danièle Ciarlet on November 29, 1943) is an actress, model, singer and icon of the 1960s and early 1970s. She is known largely for her lead role in Éric Rohmer's Love in the Afternoon. 

The screen name "Zouzou" reportedly stems from her zézaiement (lisp) of the consonants 's','j' and 'z'.

Personal life
Zouzou obtained her baccalauréat at 14, then enrolled at the Artistic Training Centre of the Académie Charpentier.

The news magazine Paris Match baptised her "la twisteuse". She represented the liberated young women, who were active during the protests of May 1968, as indeed Zouzou was.

She moved to swinging London with Brian Jones, but left him and returned to Paris.

Career
After appearing in some short films, Zouzou came to international prominence in 1972 in Rohmer's Love in the Afternoon. She was featured in French film and TV throughout the 1970s. In 1978, she left Paris for the Antilles where she remained for seven years as her career waned. She returned to France in 1985.

In 2002, Zouzou co-starred in the short film Signe d'hiver ("Sign of winter"), directed by Jean-Claude Moireau and also starring Marie Rousseau and Cyrille Thouvenin. In 2003, her autobiography, Jusqu' à l' aube ("Until dawn"), co-written with Olivier Nicklaus, was published by Flammarion. At the beginning of 2004, a retrospective of Zouzou was organized by Centre Georges Pompidou. In 2005, Zouzou appeared at the Sentier des Halles club in Paris.

Selected filmography
 Le Lit De La Vierge (1970)
 Love in the Afternoon (1972)
 S*P*Y*S (1974)
 The Last Woman (1976)
 Sky Riders (1976)

References

Further reading
 Jusqu'à l'aube, autobiography co-written with by Olivier Nicklaus, Éditions Flammarion, Paris.

External links
Official web site (apparently unmaintained)
 

1943 births
Living people
French female models
French women singers
French film actresses
Pieds-Noirs
People from Blida
French television actresses